The “National Salvation Front” in Tunisia (NSFT) is a Tunisian political group headed by Ahmed Najib Chebbi, founded on 31 May 2022, 10 months after the political crisis  in Tunisia. The Front includes several Tunisian political entities opposing what the President Kais Saied done starting from suspending the House of Representatives, and other measures that the Front considers a coup against legitimacy. Among the front's participants are Ennahda Movement, Amal Movement, Tunisia Movement of Will, Dignity Coalition and Heart of Tunisia, Citizens’ Movement against the Coup, the Democratic Initiative, the National Salvation Meeting, the Tunisian Movement for Democracy, the Meeting for Tunisia, the Youth Meeting for Democracy and Social Justice, and the Coordination of Parliament Representatives.

Executive Body
It was announced that the executive body of the Front includes Ahmed Najib Chebbi, Samira al-Shawashi, Johar bin Mubarak, Rida Belhaj, Riad Al-Shuaibi, Omar Al-Saifawi, Samir Dilou, Yousry Al-Dali, Sami Al-Shabi, and Mohammed Amin Al-Saeedani.

Democracy and Ennahda
NSFT have been accused of siding with Ennahda Movement and trying and bring it back to the political scene. On 20 August 2022, Najib Chebbi denied the claim that the front was trying to bring Ennahda back to power, and said that the front's ultimate objective is to restore democracy in the country.

Members

References

2022 establishments in Africa
2022 in Tunisia
Organizations established in 2022
Political opposition organizations
Political party alliances in Tunisia
Politics of Tunisia